Petr Imre (born 17 July 1975) is a Czech rower. He competed at the 2004 Summer Olympics in Athens with the men's coxless pair where they were eliminated in round one.

References

1975 births
Living people 
Czech male rowers
Olympic rowers of the Czech Republic
Rowers at the 2004 Summer Olympics
Rowers from Prague